Ditchingham is a village and civil parish in the English county of Norfolk.  It is located across the River Waveney from Bungay, Suffolk.

History
Ditchingham's name is of Anglo-Saxon origin and derives from the Old English for the homestead or settlement of 'Dicca's' people.

In the Domesday Book, Ditchingham is listed as a settlement of 36 households in the hundred of Lodding. In 1086, the village formed part of the East Anglian estates of King William I.

In 1855, an Anglican convent known as the Community of All Hallows was founded in Ditchingham by Lavinia Crosse and Reverend William E. Scudamore. The convent acted as a refuge for women in 'moral danger' and other destitute individuals. The community closed in 2018.

Lilias Rider Haggard's novel, The Rabbit Skin Cap (1939) tells the life story of George Baldry, a local inventor and poacher. The picture on the front cover of the book is a painting by Edward Seago of local schoolboy, Douglas Walter Gower. In later life, Gower discovered the tusk of a woolly mammoth near the long barrow on Broome Heath which is now displayed in Norwich Castle Museum.

Much of the surrounding countryside is part of the estate centred on Ditchingham Hall which was built in the Eighteenth Century and features gardens designed by Capability Brown. The Hall is the ancestral seat of the Earl Ferrers and is currently in the possession of Robert Shirley, 14th Earl Ferrers.

Geography

Ditchingham falls within the constituency of South Norfolk and is represented at Parliament by Richard Bacon MP of the Conservative Party. A new two-member electoral ward called Ditchingham and Earsham was created for the 2019 district council elections, consisting of 5,132 people of voting age. For the purposes of local government, the parish falls within the district of South Norfolk.

St. Mary's Church
Ditchingham's parish church is dedicated to Saint Mary and boasts one of the tallest Fifteenth Century towers in South Norfolk. During the Nineteenth Century, the chancel was remodelled by Anthony Salvin followed by a restoration of the chancel arch and nave roof by Frederick Preedy. St. Mary's has an interesting set of stained glass windows depicting Edmund Tudor with Lady Margaret Beaufort, a series of knights and a timeline of rectors of the church, the manufacturer of the windows are unknown. The church is a Grade I listed building.

Chicken Roundabout
Ditchingham's Chicken roundabout had been home to a group of feral chickens as early as the mid-1990s, cared for by a local man called Gordon Knowles. The number of birds living at the roundabout increased and declined over the years due to a range of factors including Avian influenza and theft. In 2010, the remaining chickens were given to a local animal charity with a plaque to Knowles' role in the local community being erected in 2012.

Amenities
Parravani's ice creams were established in the village in the early C20 and Lamberts Coaches are another long established local company.

Notable Residents
 Sir John Hobart, 3rd Baronet (1628-1683)- English landowner and politician
 Philip Bedingfield (d.1660)- English landowner and politician
 Rr-Adm. Samuel Sutton (1760-1832)- British naval officer
 William E. Scudamore (1813-1881)- English priest and historian
 Lavinia Crosse (1821-1890)- founder of Community of All Hallows
 James Franck Bright (1832-1920)- British historian
 Sir H. Rider Haggard (1856-1925)- British author of King Solomon's Mines and the Allan Quatermain Series
 William Carr (1862-1925)- British biographer and historian
 Lilias Rider Haggard (1892-1968)- British nurse and author
 Lt-Col Victor Buller Turner VC- (1900-1972) British soldier and recipient of the Victoria Cross
 Diana Athill (1917-2019)- British literary editor and novelist
 Robert Shirley, 13th Earl Ferrers (1929-2012)- British politician and peer
 Kevin Steggles (b.1961)- Ipswich Town and Port Vale footballer
 Deb Murrell (b.1966)- British cyclist
 Jimmy Lewis (b.1967)- Norfolk cricketer

War Memorial
Ditchingham's war memorial is an almost unique memorial featuring the names of the fallen above a life-sized figure of a soldier lying in state cast in bronze, designed by Francis Derwent Wood. The memorial lists the following names for the First World War:
 Sergeant Herbert H. Bird (1886-1916), 2/6th Battalion, Gloucestershire Regiment
 Sergeant Ernest W. Seeley (1882-1915), 6th Battalion, South Lancashire Regiment
 Lance-Sergeant Hubert G. Strowger (d.1916), 2nd Battalion, Royal Norfolk Regiment
 Corporal Bertie A. Johnson (d.1918), 7th Battalion, Suffolk Regiment
 Lance-Corporal Harold C. Edmunds (1896-1918), 1/1st Battalion, Cambridgeshire Regiment
 Lance-Corporal Gordon C. Williams (d.1918), 1st Battalion, Royal Norfolk Regiment
 Gunner Harry Runicles (1897-1916), 86th Brigade, Royal Field Artillery
 Gunner George A. Smith (1887-1917), 321st (Siege) Battery, Royal Garrison Artillery
 Private Harold A. Fiske (1896-1915), A Company, Royal Army Service Corps
 Private Ernest A. Reynolds (d.1916), 8th Battalion, Border Regiment
 Private Ralph R. Butcher (d.1916), 2nd Battalion, Coldstream Guards
 Private Philip C. Simmons (1888-1916), 5th Battalion, Royal East Kent Regiment
 Private Daniel D. Fairhead (1891-1918), 34th Battalion, Royal Fusiliers
 Private Jacob E. Kent (1889-1918), 1st Battalion, Royal Irish Fusiliers
 Private Sidney Bird (1888-1917), 76th Company, Machine Gun Corps
 Private Albert V. Gorbel (1890-1916), 1st Battalion, Middlesex Regiment
 Private Reginald H. V. Dobbie (1888-1915), Wellington Infantry Regiment, New Zealand Expeditionary Force
 Private Augustus G. Williams (1885-1914), 1st Battalion, Royal Norfolk Regiment
 Private Harry Codling (1895-1915), 1/4th Battalion, Royal Norfolk Regiment
 Private William H. Norman (1886-1916), 8th Battalion, Royal Norfolk Regiment
 Private Arthur Gillingwater (d.1916), 9th Battalion, Royal Norfolk Regiment
 Private Harry A. Hale (d.1916), 1st Battalion, Northamptonshire Regiment
 Private Kenneth R. Hamilton (1897-1916), 1st Battalion, Northamptonshire Regiment
 Private Bertie Prior (d.1917), 2nd Battalion, Queen's Royal Regiment
 Private Alan G. Attoe (1900-1918), 20th (Training) Battalion, Rifle Brigade
 Private Arthur L. Garrould (1881-1918), 15th Battalion, Royal Scots
 Private George H. Hansy (d.1915), 7th Battalion, Suffolk Regiment
 C. Gray
 W. I. Sampson

And, the following for the Second World War:
 Second-Lieutenant Jerome E. O. Treherne (1924-1944), Oxfordshire and Buckinghamshire Light Infantry
 Leading-Aircraftman James C. Lambert (1923-1941), Royal Air Force
 Gunner Frederick A. Plumb (1916-1941), 37th (Light) Anti-Aircraft Regiment, Royal Artillery
 Private William Reeve (1913-1941), 1st Battalion, Hertfordshire Regiment
 Private Sidney D. Fairhead (1920-1943), 5th Battalion, Royal Norfolk Regiment

Also featured on the war memorial is Nurse Mary Rodwell of Queen Alexandra's Royal Army Nursing Corps who was killed when HMHS Anglia hit a sea mine close to Folkestone.

References

External links 

 Bath Hills Footpath — Bungay Tourism
 James Lambert — Roll of Honour
 The Ice Cream Man — Parravanis
 
 Information from Genuki Norfolk on Ditchingham.
 Information from NorfolkChurches.co.uk on St Mary's Church, Ditchingham
 Anglican Community of All Hallows information on the Anglican Community of All Hallows.
 http://news.bbc.co.uk/1/hi/england/2305557.stm

Villages in Norfolk
Civil parishes in Norfolk